Sir Philip Stapleton of Wighill and of Warter-on-the-Wolds, Yorkshire (1603 – 18 August 1647) was an English Member of Parliament, a supporter of the Parliamentary cause during the English Civil War. His surname is also sometimes spelt Stapylton or Stapilton.

Life
Born in Warter-on-the-Wolds, Yorkshire, he was the second son of Sir Henry Stapleton of Wighill (Wighill, Yorkshire, 1572 – St. Andrews, 16 February 1630/1631) and wife Mary Forster (Bamborough Castle, Northumberland, 30 March 1569 – St. Andrew Holborn Parish, London, Middlesex, 6 November 1656). He was admitted as a fellow commoner of Queens' College, Cambridge in 1617. In 1630, he was knighted.

He served as MP for Hedon in the Short Parliament (April 1640) and Boroughbridge in the Long Parliament (Nov 1640). In 1642, he was appointed parliamentary commissioner in Yorkshire. When the civil war broke out he was made a colonel of horse and commander of the Earl of Essex's bodyguard. He commanded a brigade of cavalry at the Battle of Edgehill, one of two held in reserve until late in the day and whose charge against the flanks and rear of the Royal infantry almost secured a parliamentary victory but proved ultimately inconclusive. He also saw action at the Battle of Chalgrove Field and at the First Battle of Newbury. He was a member of the Committee of Safety appointed in 1642 and of the Committee of Both Kingdoms which replaced it in 1643.

However, he fell out of favour when he opposed the Self-Denying Ordinance and the advancement of Oliver Cromwell. In 1647, he was one of the eleven members of Parliament impeached by the army, but managed to escape to Calais, and died at a local Inn there later the same year of fever, perhaps plague, and was buried in Calais.

Family
Stapleton married twice, first in 1627 to Frances Hotham (1605–1636), daughter of Sir John Hotham, 1st Baronet, and wife Katherine Rodes, widow of John Gee, Esq., of Beverley (1606–1627), with issue, by whom he had two sons: 
 Robert Stapleton of Wighill (1629–1675), unmarried and without issue
 John Stapleton of Warter and of Wighill (Warter, York, East Riding of Yorkshire, 1630 – 1697/1706), married Elizabeth Mary Lawson (Isel, Cumberland, 1635 – Yorkshire, 1743), daughter of Sir Wilfrid Lawson, 1st Baronet, of Isell, and wife Jane Musgrave, and had issue: 
 Isabella Stapleton, wife of Sir William Pennington, 1st Baronet of Muncaster, and had issue
 Thomas William Stapleton I (Salford, Lancashire, 1658 – Middlesex County, Colony of Virginia, 6 November 1706), Medical Doctor, married Frances Needles (Poole, Yorkshire, 1663 – Colony of Virginia, 18 November 1697), and had issue, the Stapleton of Virginia

His second wife was Barbara Lennard (Hurstmonceaux, Sussex, 1 April 1604 – ca. 1665), daughter of Henry Lennard, 12th Baron Dacre, and wife Chrysogona Baker. Their eight children were: 
 Katherine Stapleton (Wighill, Yorkshire, 1632 – ?), unmarried and without issue
 Philipa Stapleton (York, Yorkshire, 1636 – 16 December 1646, bur. London, Middlesex)
 Henry Stapleton of Wighill (York, Yorkshire, 1639 – 1723), unmarried and without issue
 Elizabeth Stapleton (11 February 1640 – ?), unmarried and without issue
 Frances Stapleton (1641 – ?), unmarried and without issue
 Isabell Stapleton (York, Yorkshire, 1642 – 16 December 1646)
 Philip Stapleton of Wighill (City of Westminster, London, Middlesex, 1645 – Wighill, Yorkshire, 9 November 1729/1734), married Margaret Gage (York, Yorkshire, 1655 – Middlesex, ca. 1743), daughter of Sir Thomas Gage, 3rd Baronet of Firle Place, and wife Ann Cotton, and had issue, the Stapleton of Wighill
 Mary Stapleton (York, Yorkshire, ca. 1647 – London, Middlesex, 1704), who married Thomas FitzWilliam, 4th Viscount FitzWilliam (Ireland, ca. 1640 – Ireland, 24 February 1704), who was a rather surprising choice of husband for a child of Sir Philip, as Thomas was an Irish Roman Catholic and a staunch Royalist; they had one surviving son.

References

Sources
 The Concise Dictionary of National Biography: From Earliest Times to 1985, Oxford University Press; 
 Stapleton genealogy
 

1603 births
1647 deaths
Alumni of Queens' College, Cambridge
Lords of the Admiralty
Military personnel from Yorkshire
English knights
Eleven Members
English MPs 1640 (April)
English MPs 1640–1648
Parliamentarian military personnel of the English Civil War